The International Court of Justice (ICJ;), sometimes known as the World Court, is one of the six principal organs of the United Nations (UN). It settles disputes between states in accordance with international law and gives advisory opinions on international legal issues. The ICJ is the only international court that adjudicates general disputes between countries, with its rulings and opinions serving as primary sources of international law (subject to Article 59 of the Statute of the International Court of Justice).

The ICJ is the successor of the Permanent Court of International Justice (PCIJ), which was established in 1920 by the League of Nations. After the Second World War, the League and the PCIJ were replaced by the United Nations and ICJ, respectively. The Statute of the ICJ, which sets forth its purpose and structure, draws heavily from that of its predecessor, whose decisions remain valid. All member states of the UN are party to the ICJ Statute and may initiate contentious cases; however, advisory proceedings may only be submitted by certain UN organs and agencies.

The ICJ consists of a panel of 15 judges elected by the UN General Assembly and Security Council for nine-year terms. No more than one judge of each nationality may be represented on court at the same time, and judges collectively must reflect the principal civilizations and legal systems of the world. Seated in the Peace Palace in The Hague, Netherlands, the ICJ is the only principal UN organ not located in New York City. Its official working languages are English and French.

Since the entry of its first case on 22 May 1947, the ICJ has entertained 184 cases through September 2022.

History 
The first permanent institution established for the purpose of settling international disputes was the Permanent Court of Arbitration (PCA), which was created by the Hague Peace Conference of 1899. Initiated by the Russian Czar Nicholas II, the conference involved all the world's major powers, as well as several smaller states, and resulted in the first multilateral treaties concerned with the conduct of warfare. Among these was the Convention for the Pacific Settlement of International Disputes, which set forth the institutional and procedural framework for arbitral proceedings, which would take place in The Hague, Netherlands. Although the proceedings would be supported by a permanent bureau—whose functions would be equivalent to that of a secretariat or court registry—the arbitrators would be appointed by the disputing states from a larger pool provided by each member of the convention. The PCA was established in 1900 and began proceedings in 1902.

A second Hague Peace Conference in 1907, which involved most of the world's sovereign states, revised the convention and enhanced the rules governing arbitral proceedings before the PCA. During this conference, the United States, Great Britain and Germany submitted a joint proposal for a permanent court whose judges would serve full-time. As the delegates could not agree as to how the judges would be selected, the matter was temporarily shelved pending an agreement to be adopted at a later convention.

The Hague Peace Conferences, and the ideas that emerged therefrom, influenced the creation of the Central American Court of Justice, which was established in 1908 as one of the earliest regional judicial bodies. Various plans and proposals were made between 1911 and 1919 for the establishment of an international judicial tribunal, which would not be realized in the formation of a new international system following the First World War.

The Permanent Court of International Justice 

The unprecedented bloodshed of the First World War led to the creation of the League of Nations, established by the Paris Peace Conference of 1919 as the first worldwide intergovernmental organization aimed at maintaining peace and collective security. Article 14 League's Covenant called for the establishment of a Permanent Court of International Justice (PCIJ), which would be responsible for adjudicating any international dispute submitted to it by the contesting parties, as well as to provide an advisory opinion upon any dispute or question referred to it by the League of Nations.

In December 1920, following several drafts and debates, the Assembly of the league unanimously adopted the statute of the PCIJ, which was signed and ratified the following year by a majority of members. Among other things, the new Statute resolved the contentious issues of selecting judges by providing that the judges be elected by both the council and the Assembly of the league concurrently but independently. The makeup of the PCIJ would reflect the "main forms of civilization and the principal legal systems of the world". The PCIJ would be permanently placed at the Peace Palace in The Hague, alongside Permanent Court of Arbitration.

The PCIJ represented a major innovation in international jurisprudence in several ways:

  Unlike previous international arbitral tribunals, it was a permanent body governed by its statutory provisions and rules of procedure
 It had a permanent registry that served as a liaison with governments and international bodies;
 Its proceedings were largely public, including pleadings, oral arguments, and all documentary evidence;
 It was accessible to all states and could be declared by states to have compulsory jurisdiction over disputes; 
 The PCIJ Statute was the first to list sources of law it would draw upon, which in turn became sources of international law
 Judges were more representative of the world and its legal systems than any prior international judicial body.
 As a permanent body, the PCIJ would, over time, make a series of decisions and rulings that would develop international law

Unlike the ICJ, the PCIJ was not part of the league, nor were members of the league automatically a party to its Statute. The United States, which played a key role in both the second Hague Peace Conference and the Paris Peace Conference, was notably not a member of the league. However, several of its nationals served as judges of the court.

From its first session in 1922 until 1940, the PCIJ dealt with 29 interstate disputes and issued 27 advisory opinions. The court's widespread acceptance was reflected by the fact that several hundred international treaties and agreements conferred jurisdiction upon it over specified categories of disputes. In addition to helping resolve several serious international disputes, the PCIJ helped clarify several ambiguities in international law that contributed to its development.

The United States played a major role in setting up the World Court but never joined. Presidents Wilson, Harding, Coolidge, Hoover, and Roosevelt all supported membership, but it was impossible to get a two-thirds majority in the Senate for a treaty.

Establishment of the International Court of Justice 
Following a peak of activity in 1933, the PCIJ began to decline in its activities due to the growing international tension and isolationism that characterized the era. The Second World War effectively put an end to the court, which held its last public session in December 1939 and issued its last orders in February 1940. In 1942 the United States and United Kingdom jointly declared support for establishing or re-establishing an international court after the war, and in 1943, the U.K. chaired a panel of jurists from around the world, the "Inter-Allied Committee", to discuss the matter. Its 1944 report recommended that:

 The statute of any new international court should be based on that of the PCIJ;
 The new court should retain an advisory jurisdiction;
 Acceptance of the new court's jurisdiction should be voluntary;
 The court should deal only with judicial and not political matters

Several months later, a conference of the major Allied Powers—China, the USSR, the U.K., and the U.S.—issued a joint declaration recognizing the necessity "of establishing at the earliest practicable date a general international organization, based on the principle of the sovereign equality of all peace-loving States, and open to membership by all such States, large and small, for the maintenance of international peace and security".

The following Allied conference at Dumbarton Oaks, in the United States, published a proposal in October 1944 that called for the establishment of an intergovernmental organization that would include an international court. A meeting was subsequently convened in Washington, D.C., in April 1945, involving 44 jurists from around the world to draft a statute for the proposed court. The draft statute was substantially similar to that of the PCIJ, and it was questioned whether a new court should even be created. During the San Francisco Conference, which took place from 25 April to 26 June 1945 and involved 50 countries, it was decided that an entirely new court should be established as a principal organ of the new United Nations. The statute of this court would form an integral part of the United Nations Charter, which, to maintain continuity, expressly held that the Statute of the International Court of Justice (ICJ) was based upon that of the PCIJ.

Consequently, the PCIJ convened for the last time in October 1945 and resolved to transfer its archives to its successor, which would take its place at the Peace Palace. The judges of the PCIJ all resigned on 31 January 1946, with the election of the first members of the ICJ taking place the following February at the First Session of the United Nations General Assembly and Security Council. In April 1946, the PCIJ was formally dissolved, and the ICJ, in its first meeting, was elected President José Gustavo Guerrero of El Salvador, who had served as the last president of the PCIJ. The court also appointed members of its Registry, mainly drawn from that of the PCIJ, and held an inaugural public sitting later that month.

The first case was submitted in May 1947 by the United Kingdom against Albania concerning incidents in the Corfu Channel.

Activities

Established in 1945 by the UN Charter, the court began work in 1946 as the successor to the Permanent Court of International Justice. The Statute of the International Court of Justice, similar to that of its predecessor, is the main constitutional document constituting and regulating the court.

The court's workload covers a wide range of judicial activity. After the court ruled that the United States's covert war against Nicaragua was in violation of international law (Nicaragua v. United States), the United States withdrew from compulsory jurisdiction in 1986 to accept the court's jurisdiction only on a discretionary basis. Chapter XIV of the United Nations Charter authorizes the UN Security Council to enforce Court rulings. However, such enforcement is subject to the veto power of the five permanent members of the council, which the United States used in the Nicaragua case.

Composition

The ICJ is composed of fifteen judges elected to nine-year terms by the UN General Assembly and the UN Security Council from a list of people nominated by the national groups in the Permanent Court of Arbitration. The election process is set out in Articles 4–19 of the ICJ Statute. Elections are staggered, with five judges elected every three years to ensure continuity within the court. Should a judge die in office, the practice has generally been to elect a judge in a special election to complete the term. Historically, deceased judges have been replaced by judges from the same region, though not —as often wrongly asserted— necessarily from the same nationality. 

No two judges may be nationals of the same country. According to Article 9, the membership of the court is supposed to represent the "main forms of civilization and of the principal legal systems of the world". That has meant common law, civil law and socialist law (now post-communist law).

There is an informal understanding that the seats will be distributed by geographic regions so that there are five seats for Western countries, three for African states (including one judge of francophone civil law, one of Anglophone common law and one Arab), two for Eastern European states, three for Asian states and two for Latin American and Caribbean states. For most of the court's history, the five permanent members of the United Nations Security Council (France, USSR, China, the United Kingdom, and the United States) have always had a judge serving, thereby occupying three of the Western seats, one of the Asian seats and one of the Eastern European seats. Exceptions have been China not having a judge on the court from 1967 to 1985, during which time it did not put forward a candidate, and British judge Sir Christopher Greenwood being withdrawn as a candidate for election for a second nine-year term on the bench in 2017, leaving no judges from the United Kingdom on the court. Greenwood had been supported by the UN Security Council but failed to get a majority in the UN General Assembly. Indian judge Dalveer Bhandari took the seat instead.

Article 6 of the Statute provides that all judges should be "elected regardless of their nationality among persons of high moral character" who are either qualified for the highest judicial office in their home states or known as lawyers with sufficient competence in international law. Judicial independence is dealt with specifically in Articles 16–18. 

Judges of the International Court of Justice are entitled to the style of His/Her Excellency. Judges are not able to hold any other post or act as counsel. In practice, members of the court have their own interpretation of these rules and many have chosen to remain involved in outside arbitration and hold professional posts as long as there is no conflict of interest. Former judge Bruno Simma and current judge Georg Nolte have acknowledged that moonlighting should be restricted. 

A judge can be dismissed only by a unanimous vote of the other members of the court. Despite these provisions, the independence of ICJ judges has been questioned. For example, during the Nicaragua case, the United States issued a communiqué suggesting that it could not present sensitive material to the court because of the presence of judges from the Soviet bloc.

Judges may deliver joint judgments or give their own separate opinions. Decisions and advisory opinions are by majority, and, in the event of an equal division, the president's vote becomes decisive, which occurred in the Legality of the Use by a State of Nuclear Weapons in Armed Conflict (Opinion requested by WHO), [1996] ICJ Reports 66. Judges may also deliver separate dissenting opinions.

In its 77 years of history, only five women have been elected to the Court, with former UN Special Rapporteur Philip Alston calling for states to take seriously questions of representation in the bench.

Ad hoc judges
Article 31 of the statute sets out a procedure whereby ad hoc judges sit on contentious cases before the court. The system allows any party to a contentious case (if it otherwise does not have one of that party's nationals sitting on the court) to select one additional person to sit as a judge on that case only. It is thus possible that as many as seventeen judges may sit on one case.

The system may seem strange when compared with domestic court processes, but its purpose is to encourage states to submit cases. For example, if a state knows that it will have a judicial officer who can participate in deliberation and offer other judges local knowledge and an understanding of the state's perspective, it may be more willing to submit to the jurisdiction of the court. Although this system does not sit well with the judicial nature of the body, it is usually of little practical consequence. Ad hoc judges usually (but not always) vote in favour of the state that appointed them and thus cancel each other out.

Chambers
Generally, the court sits as full bench, but in the last fifteen years, it has on occasion sat as a chamber. Articles 26–29 of the statute allow the court to form smaller chambers, usually 3 or 5 judges, to hear cases. Two types of chambers are contemplated by Article 26: firstly, chambers for special categories of cases, and second, the formation of ad hoc chambers to hear particular disputes. In 1993, a special chamber was established, under Article 26(1) of the ICJ statute, to deal specifically with environmental matters (although it has never been used).

Ad hoc chambers are more frequently convened. For example, chambers were used to hear the Gulf of Maine Case (Canada/US). In that case, the parties made clear they would withdraw the case unless the court appointed judges to the chamber acceptable to the parties. Judgments of chambers may have either less authority than full Court judgments or diminish the proper interpretation of universal international law informed by a variety of cultural and legal perspectives. On the other hand, the use of chambers might encourage greater recourse to the court and thus enhance international dispute resolution.

Current composition
, the composition of the court is as follows:

Presidents

Jurisdiction

As stated in Article 93 of the UN Charter, all  UN members are automatically parties to the court's statute. Non-UN members may also become parties to the court's statute under the Article 93(2) procedure, which was used by Switzerland in 1948 and Nauru in 1988, prior to either joining the UN. Once a state is a party to the court's statute, it is entitled to participate in cases before the court. However, being a party to the statute does not automatically give the court jurisdiction over disputes involving those parties. The issue of jurisdiction is considered in the three types of ICJ cases: contentious issues, incidental jurisdiction, and advisory opinions.

Contentious issues

In contentious cases (adversarial proceedings seeking to settle a dispute), the ICJ produces a binding ruling between states that agree to submit to the ruling of the court. Only states may be parties in contentious cases; individuals, corporations, component parts of a federal state, NGOs, UN organs, and self-determination groups are excluded from direct participation, although the court may receive information from public international organizations. However, this does not preclude non-state interests from being the subject of proceedings; for example, a state may bring a case on behalf of one of its nationals or corporations, such as in matters concerning diplomatic protection.

Jurisdiction is often a crucial question for the court in contentious cases. The key principle is that the ICJ has jurisdiction only on the basis of consent. Under Article 36, there are four foundations for the court's jurisdiction:
 Compromis or "special agreement", in which parties provide explicit consent to the court's jurisdiction by referring cases to it. While not true compulsory jurisdiction, this is perhaps the most effective jurisdictional basis, because the parties concerned have a desire for the dispute to be resolved by the court, and are thus more likely to comply with the court's judgment.
 Compromissory clauses in a binding treaty. Most modern treaties contain such clauses to provide for dispute resolution by the ICJ. Cases founded on compromissory clauses have not been as effective as cases founded on special agreement, since a state may have no interest in having the matter examined by the court and may refuse to comply with a judgment. For example, during the Iran hostage crisis, Iran refused to participate in a case brought by the US based on a compromissory clause contained in the Vienna Convention on Diplomatic Relations and did not comply with the judgment. Since the 1970s, the use of such clauses has declined; many modern treaties set out their own dispute resolution regime, often based on forms of arbitration.
 Optional clause declarations accepting the court's jurisdiction. Also known as Article 36(2) jurisdiction, it is sometimes misleadingly labeled "compulsory", though such declarations are voluntary. Many such declarations contain reservations that exclude from jurisdiction certain types of disputes (ratione materia). The principle of reciprocity may further limit jurisdiction, as Article 36(2) holds that such declaration may be made "in relation to any other State accepting the same obligation...". As of January 2018, seventy-four states had a declaration in force, up from sixty-six in February 2011; of the permanent Security Council members, only the United Kingdom has a declaration. In the court's early years, most declarations were made by industrialized countries. Since the 1986 Nicaragua case, declarations made by developing countries have increased, reflecting a growing confidence in the court. However, even those industrialized countries that have invoked optional declarations have sometimes increased exclusions or rescinded them altogether. Notable examples include the United States in the Nicaragua case, and Australia, which modified its declaration in 2002 to exclude disputes on maritime boundaries, most likely to prevent an impending challenge from East Timor, which gained independence two months later.
 Article 36(5) provides for jurisdiction on the basis of declarations made under the Statute of the Permanent Court of International Justice. Article 37 similarly transfers jurisdiction under any compromissory clause in a treaty that gave jurisdiction to the PCIJ.
Additionally, the court may have jurisdiction on the basis of tacit consent (forum prorogatum). In the absence of clear jurisdiction under Article 36, jurisdiction is established if the respondent accepts ICJ jurisdiction explicitly or simply pleads on the merits. This arose in the 1949 Corfu Channel Case (U.K. v. Albania), in which the court held that a letter from Albania stating that it submitted to the jurisdiction of the ICJ was sufficient to grant the court jurisdiction.

Incidental jurisdiction 
Until rendering a final judgment, the court has competence to order interim measures for the protection of the rights of a party to a dispute. One or both parties to a dispute may apply the ICJ for issuing interim measures. In the Frontier Dispute Case, both parties to the dispute, Burkina Faso and Mali, submitted an application to the court to indicate interim measures. Incidental jurisdiction of the court derives from the Article 41 of its Statute. Similar to the final judgment, the order for interim measures of the court are binding on state parties to the dispute. The ICJ has competence to indicate interim measures only if the prima facie jurisdiction is satisfied.

Advisory opinions
 An advisory opinion is a function of the court open only to specified United Nations bodies and agencies. The UN Charter grants the General Assembly or the Security Council the power to request the court to issue an advisory opinion on any legal question. Organs of the UN other than the General Assembly or the Security Council require the General Assembly's authorization to request an advisory opinion of the ICJ. These organs of the UN only request an advisory opinion regarding the matters that fall within the scope of their activities. On receiving a request, the court decides which states and organizations might provide useful information and gives them an opportunity to present written or oral statements. Advisory opinions were intended as a means by which UN agencies could seek the court's help in deciding complex legal issues that might fall under their respective mandates.

In principle, the court's advisory opinions are only consultative in character but they are influential and widely respected. Certain instruments or regulations can provide in advance that the advisory opinion shall be specifically binding on particular agencies or states, but inherently they are non-binding under the Statute of the court. This non-binding character does not mean that advisory opinions are without legal effect, because the legal reasoning embodied in them reflects the court's authoritative views on important issues of international law. In arriving at them, the court follows essentially the same rules and procedures that govern its binding judgments delivered in contentious cases submitted to it by sovereign states.

An advisory opinion derives its status and authority from the fact that it is the official pronouncement of the principal judicial organ of the United Nations.

Advisory opinions have often been controversial because the questions asked are controversial or the case was pursued as an indirect way of bringing what is really a contentious case before the court. Examples of advisory opinions can be found in the section advisory opinions in the List of International Court of Justice cases article. One such well-known advisory opinion is the Nuclear Weapons Case.

Examples of contentious cases

 1980: A complaint by the United States that Iran was detaining American diplomats in Tehran in violation of international law.
 1982: A dispute between Tunisia and Libya over the delimitation of the continental shelf between them.
 1989: A complaint by Iran after the shooting down of Iran Air Flight 655 by a United States Navy guided missile cruiser.
 1984: A dispute over the course of the maritime boundary dividing the U.S. and Canada in the Gulf of Maine area.
 1999: A complaint by the Federal Republic of Yugoslavia against the member states of the North Atlantic Treaty Organization regarding their actions in the Kosovo War. This was denied on 15 December 2004 because of lack of jurisdiction, the FRY not being a party to the ICJ statute at the time it made the application.
 2011: A complaint by the Republic of North Macedonia (former Yugoslav Republic of Macedonia) that Greece's vetoing of its accession to NATO violates the Interim Accord of 13 September 1995 between the two countries. The complaint was decided in favour of North Macedonia on 5 December 2011.
 2005: A complaint by the Democratic Republic of the Congo that its sovereignty had been violated by Uganda and that the DRC had lost billions of dollars worth of resources was decided in favour of the DRC.
 2017: A complaint by the Republic of India regarding a death penalty verdict against an Indian citizen, Kulbhushan Jadhav, by a Pakistani military court (based on alleged espionage and subversive activities).
 2022: A complaint by Ukraine against Russia for violating the 1948 Genocide Convention, to which both Ukraine and Russia are parties, by falsely claiming genocide as a pretext for invading Ukraine. The International Association of Genocide Scholars supported Ukraine, who asked for expedited provisional measures directing Russia to halt its offensive. Russian representatives refused to appear. On 16 March, the ICJ ordered Russia to "immediately suspend the military operations", on a 13–2 vote with the Russian and Chinese judges in opposition. The order is binding on Russia, but the ICJ cannot enforce it.

Relationship with UN Security Council
Article 94 establishes the duty of all UN members to comply with decisions of the court involving them. If parties do not comply, the issue may be taken before the Security Council for enforcement action. There are obvious problems with such a method of enforcement. If the judgment is against one of the five permanent members of the Security Council or its allies, any resolution on enforcement would then be vetoed. That occurred, for example, after the Nicaragua case, when Nicaragua brought the issue of the United States' noncompliance with the court's decision before the Security Council. Furthermore, if the Security Council refuses to enforce a judgment against any other state, there is no method of forcing the state to comply. Furthermore, the most effective form to take action for the Security Council, coercive action under Chapter VII of the United Nations Charter, can be justified only if international peace and security are at stake. The Security Council has never done that so far.

The relationship between the ICJ and the Security Council, and the separation of their powers, was considered by the court in 1992 in the Pan Am case. The court had to consider an application from Libya for the order of provisional measures of protection to safeguard its rights, which, it alleged, were being infringed by the threat of economic sanctions by the United Kingdom and United States. The problem was that these sanctions had been authorized by the Security Council, which resulted in a potential conflict between the Chapter VII functions of the Security Council and the judicial function of the court. The court decided, by eleven votes to five, that it could not order the requested provisional measures because the rights claimed by Libya, even if legitimate under the 1971 Montreal Convention, could not be prima facie regarded as appropriate since the action was ordered by the Security Council. In accordance with Article 103 of the UN Charter, obligations under the Charter took precedence over other treaty obligations. Nevertheless, the court declared the application admissible in 1998. A decision on the merits has not been given since the parties (United Kingdom, United States, and Libya) settled the case out of court in 2003.

There was a marked reluctance on the part of a majority of the court to become involved in a dispute in such a way as to bring it potentially into conflict with the Council. The court stated in the Nicaragua case that there is no necessary inconsistency between action by the Security Council and adjudication by the ICJ. However, when there is room for conflict, the balance appears to be in favour of the Security Council.

Should either party fail "to perform the obligations incumbent upon it under a judgment rendered by the Court", the Security Council may be called upon to "make recommendations or decide upon measures" if the Security Council deems such actions necessary. In practice, the court's powers have been limited by the unwillingness of the losing party to abide by the court's ruling and by the Security Council's unwillingness to impose consequences. However, in theory, "so far as the parties to the case are concerned, a judgment of the Court is binding, final and without appeal", and "by signing the Charter, a State Member of the United Nations undertakes to comply with any decision of the International Court of Justice in a case to which it is a party."

For example, the United States had previously accepted the court's compulsory jurisdiction upon its creation in 1946 but in 1984, after Nicaragua v. United States, withdrew its acceptance following the court's judgment that called on the US to "cease and to refrain" from the "unlawful use of force" against the government of Nicaragua. The court ruled (with only the American judge dissenting) that the United States was "in breach of its obligation under the Treaty of Friendship with Nicaragua not to use force against Nicaragua" and ordered the United States to pay war reparations.

Law applied

When deciding cases, the court applies international law as summarized in Article 38 of the ICJ Statute, which provides that in arriving at its decisions the court shall apply international conventions, international custom and the "general principles of law recognized by civilized nations." It may also refer to academic writing ("the teachings of the most highly qualified publicists of the various nations") and previous judicial decisions to help interpret the law although the court is not formally bound by its previous decisions under the doctrine of stare decisis. Article 59 makes clear that the common law notion of precedent or stare decisis does not apply to the decisions of the ICJ. The court's decision binds only the parties to that particular controversy. Under 38(1)(d), however, the court may consider its own previous decisions and frequently cites them.

If the parties agree, they may also grant the court the liberty to decide ex aequo et bono ("out of equality, and for the good"), granting the ICJ the freedom to make an equitable decision based on what is fair under the circumstances. That provision has not been used in the court's history. So far, the International Court of Justice has dealt with about 180 cases.

Procedure
The ICJ is vested with the power to make its own rules. Court procedure is set out in the Rules of Court of the International Court of Justice 1978 (as amended on 29 September 2005).

Cases before the ICJ will follow a standard pattern. The case is lodged by the applicant, which files a written memorial setting out the basis of the court's jurisdiction and the merits of its claim. The respondent may accept the court's jurisdiction and file its own memorial on the merits of the case.

Preliminary objections
A respondent that does not wish to submit to the jurisdiction of the court may raise preliminary objections. Any such objections must be ruled upon before the court can address the merits of the applicant's claim. Often, a separate public hearing is held on the preliminary objections and the court will render a judgment. Respondents normally file preliminary objections to the jurisdiction of the court and/or the admissibility of the case. Inadmissibility refers to a range of arguments about factors the court should take into account in deciding jurisdiction, such as the fact that the issue is not justiciable or that it is not a "legal dispute".

In addition, objections may be made because all necessary parties are not before the court. If the case necessarily requires the court to rule on the rights and obligations of a state that has not consented to the court's jurisdiction, the court does not proceed to issue a judgment on the merits.

If the court decides it has jurisdiction and the case is admissible, the respondent then is required to file a Memorial addressing the merits of the applicant's claim. Once all written arguments are filed, the court holds a public hearing on the merits.

Once a case has been filed, any party (usually the applicant) may seek an order from the court to protect the status quo pending the hearing of the case. Such orders are known as Provisional (or Interim) Measures and are analogous to interlocutory injunctions in United States law. Article 41 of the statute allows the court to make such orders. The court must be satisfied to have prima facie jurisdiction to hear the merits of the case before it grants provisional measures.

Applications to intervene
In cases in which a third state's interests are affected, that state may be permitted to intervene in the case and participate as a full party. Under Article 62, a state "with an interest of a legal nature" may apply; however, it is within the court's discretion whether or not to allow the intervention. Intervention applications are rare, and the first successful application occurred only in 1991.

Judgment and remedies
Once deliberation has taken place, the court issues a majority opinion. Individual judges may issue concurring opinions (if they agree with the outcome reached in the judgment of the court but differ in their reasoning) or dissenting opinions (if they disagree with the majority). No appeal is possible, but any party may ask for the court to clarify if there is a dispute as to the meaning or scope of the court's judgment.

Criticisms

The International Court has been criticized with respect to its rulings, its procedures, and its authority. As with criticisms of the United Nations, many critics and opponents of the court refer to the general authority assigned to the body by member states through its Charter, rather than to specific problems with the composition of judges or their rulings. Major criticisms include the following:
 "Compulsory" jurisdiction is limited to cases where both parties have agreed to submit to its decision, and so instances of aggression tend to be automatically escalated to and adjudicated by the Security Council. According to the sovereignty principle of international law, no nation is superior or inferior against another. Therefore, there is no entity that could force the states into practice of the law or punish the states in case any violation of international law occurs. Therefore, the absence of binding force means that the  member states of the ICJ do not necessarily have to accept the jurisdiction. Moreover, membership in the UN and ICJ does not give the court automatic jurisdiction over the member states, but it is the consent of each state to follow the jurisdiction that matters.
 The International Court of Justice cannot hear the cases of organizations, private enterprises, and individuals. Furthermore, UN agencies are unable to raise a case except in the circumstance of a non-binding advisory opinion. The national states are the only ones who are able to bring cases for and act as defendants for these individuals. As a result, victims of war crimes, crimes against humanity and minority groups may not have the support of their national state. 
 Other existing international thematic courts, such as the ICC, are not under the umbrella of the International Court. Unlike ICJ, international thematic courts like ICC work independently from United Nations. Such dualistic structure between various international courts sometimes makes it hard for the courts to engage in effective and collective jurisdiction.
 The International Court does not enjoy a full separation of powers, with permanent members of the Security Council being able to veto enforcement of cases, even those to which they consented to be bound. Because the jurisdiction does not have binding force itself, in many cases, the instances of aggression are adjudicated by Security Council by adopting a resolution, etc. There is, therefore, a likelihood for the permanent member states of Security Council to avoid the legal responsibility brought up by International Court of Justice, as shown in the example of Nicaragua v. United States.
 The court has been accused of judicial parsimony, with its rulings tending to dismiss submissions of parties on jurisdictional grounds and not resolving the underlying dispute between them.

Notable people
 

Arthur Witteveen, First Secretary

See also

 International Criminal Court
 International Criminal Tribunal for Rwanda
 International Criminal Tribunal for the former Yugoslavia
 International Tribunal for the Law of the Sea
 List of treaties that confer jurisdiction on the International Court of Justice
 Provisional measure of protection
 Supranational aspects of international organizations
 Universal jurisdiction

References

Further reading
 Accinelli, R. D. "Peace Through Law: The United States and the World Court, 1923–1935". Historical Papers / Communications historiques, 7#1 (1972) 247–261. .
 Bowett, D W. The International court of justice : process, practice and procedure (British Institute of International and Comparative Law: London, 1997).
 Creamer, Cosette & Godzmirka, Zuzanna. "The Job Market for Justice: Screening and Selecting Candidates for the International Court of Justice", Leiden Journal of International Law (2017).
 Dunne, Michael. "Isolationism of a Kind: Two Generations of World Court Historiography in the United States," Journal of American Studies (1987) 21#3 pp 327–351.
 Kahn, Gilbert N. "Presidential Passivity on a Nonsalient Issue: President Franklin D. Roosevelt and the 1935 World Court Fight." Diplomatic History 4.2 (1980): 137–160.
 Kolb, Robert, The International Court of Justice  (Hart Publishing: Oxford, 2013).
 Patterson, David S. "The United States and the origins of the world court". Political Science Quarterly 91.2 (1976): 279–295. .
 Rosenne, S., Rosenne's the world court: what it is and how it works (6th ed.). Leiden: Martinus Nijhoff, 2003.
 Van Der Wolf W. & De Ruiter D., "The International Court of Justice: Facts and Documents About the History and Work of the Court" (International Courts Association, 2011)
 
 Yee, Sienho. "Article 38 of the ICJ Statute and Applicable Law: Selected Issues in Recent Cases", Journal of International Dispute Settlement 7 (2016), 472–498.
 Zimmermann, Andreas; Christian Tomuschat, Karin Oellers-Frahm &  Christian J. Tams (eds.), The Statute of the International Court of Justice: A Commentary (2nd. ed. October 2012, Oxford University Press).

External links

 Official site
 ICJ Multimedia Gallery (photos, videos, webstreaming)
 List of cases ruled upon by the ICJ since its creation in 1946
 Peace Palace Library – ICJ Research Guide 
 The Statute of the International Court of Justice on the United Nations AVL: summary of the procedural history, list of selected preparatory documents and audiovisual material related to the negotiations and adoption of the Statute.
 International Criminal Court : See also, a tribunal to prosecute individuals for genocide, crimes against humanity, war crimes, and the crime of aggression
 CIJ ICJ: International Court of Justice on Youtube

Lectures
 The ICJ in the Service of Peace and Justice, Conference organized on the Occasion of the Centenary of the Peace Palace
 Lecture by Awn Shawkat Al-Khasawneh entitled "Reflections on the Jurisdiction of the International Court of Justice" in the Lecture Series of the United Nations Audiovisual Library of International Law
 Lecture by Mohamed Bennouna entitled "La Cour internationale de Justice, juge des souverainetés?" in the Lecture Series of the United Nations Audiovisual Library of International Law
 Lecture by Philippe Couvreur entitled "La Cour internationale de Justice" in the Lecture Series of the United Nations Audiovisual Library of International Law
 Lecture by Vera Gowlland-Debbas entitled "The International Court of Justice as the Principal Judicial Organ of the United Nations" in the Lecture Series of the United Nations Audiovisual Library of International Law
 Lecture by Mariko Kawano entitled "Some Salient Features of the Contemporary International Disputes in the Precedents of the International Court of Justice" in the Lecture Series of the United Nations Audiovisual Library of International Law
 Lecture by Mariko Kawano entitled "International Court of Justice and Disputes Involving the Interests of Third Parties to the Proceedings or the Common Interests of the International Community as a Whole or of the Community Established by a Convention" in the Lecture Series of the United Nations Audiovisual Library of International Law
 Lecture by Edward McWhinney entitled "Judicial Activism and the International Court of Justice" in the Lecture Series of the United Nations Audiovisual Library of International Law
 Lecture by Alain Pellet entitled "Conseil devant la Cour internationale de Justice" in the Lecture Series of the United Nations Audiovisual Library of International Law
 Lecture by Jiuyong Shi entitled "The Present and Future Role of the International Court of Justice in the Peaceful Settlement of International Disputes" in the Lecture Series of the United Nations Audiovisual Library of International Law

 
Articles containing video clips
Courts and tribunals established in 1945
Netherlands and the United Nations
Organisations based in The Hague
Peace organizations
United Nations courts and tribunals
United Nations organs